Dayna McLeod (born 1972) is a Montreal based performance artist and video artist whose work often includes topics of feminism, queer identity, and sexuality.

She has a Diploma in Sculpture from the Alberta College of Art and Design and an M.F.A. in Open Media from Concordia University. She is currently competing a Ph.D in Humanities at The Centre for Interdisciplinary Studies in Society and Culture at Concordia University.

Career
A regular performer at Montreal's Kiss My Cabaret, Meow Mix, Le Boudoir, and Edgy Women Festival, McLeod's work utilizes performance-based, remix and cabaret and practices.

She has performed in ten annual editions of the Edgy Women Festival and her work has been shown internationally. One of her notable works was her "cougar for a year" project, in which she dressed in animal print from June 1, 2012, to June 1, 2013. "Cougar for a year" won La Centrale's 2014 Prix Powerhouse for her radical honesty and courage in the face of normalization in our culture. Dayna has also won numerous other awards, and has received funding for video projects from the Canada Council and the Conseil des arts et des lettres du Québec.

Her body often figures prominently in her performances, such as Uterine Concert Hall an in-situ, sound performance where audience members were invited to listen through her uterus via stethoscope to music and soundscapes played from a speaker inserted into her vagina, and Cougar For a Year in which she wore animal print clothing for an entire year, 24/7 to "[focus] on a public examination of the female body, especially an older woman’s body in a cultural space where this body has somehow become public property ripe for commentary".

McLeod is also a video maker, utilizing performance-based practices where she performs directly for the camera, often combining this technique with remix practices, such as in Ultimate SUB Ultimate DOM: Maria Von Trapp & Mary Poppins and That's Right Diana Barry- You Needed Me.

Works

Performance Art
 2016 - Uterine Concert Hall, Darling Foundry
 2016 - What’s in the Box?, La Chapelle Theatre, Montreal
 2015 - Santa’s Wife and The Baby Dyke, Centaur Theatre, Montreal
 2015 - Live For Menopause
 2014 - Bronze Cowboy
 2012 - Cougar For a Year
 2009 - AV Machine collaboration with Alexis O’Hara
 2008 - Come Shred My Heart
 2007 - Monarchy Mama
 2007 - Car Wash!, La Centrale, Montreal
 2004 - Sex Accidents and Home Repair, Studio 303, Montreal
 2004 - The One: a collaboration, collaboration with Jackie Gallant, Studio 303, Montreal
 2003 - Feminism: Your body is revolting
 2001 - Tales From the Canadian Beaver trilogy (Oh Canada, Show us Your Beaver; Beaver Fever; Santa Beaver)

Videos
 2015 - Undercover Lesbian SUPERCUT (Rizzoli & Isles S1.E6)
 2015 - Older Woman Gentlemanly Dating with a Lesbian Ending SUPERCUT (Psych S5.E4)
 2015 - Class Action Baby Supercut (The Good Wife S1.E17)
 2014 - The Woman Who Paints in Blood Anti-Aging SUPERCUT 
 2014 - Creep, collaboration with Jackie Gallant
 2011 - Nothing Compares to You
 2011 - Don't Ask Don't Tell Gay, Gay, Gay
 2011 - Peptalk.
 2011 - Breaking up with Stephen Harper
 2010 - The Cremation of Sam McGee
 2010 - Thong
 2009 - Ultimate SUB Ultimate DOM: Maria Von Trapp & Mary Poppins
 2009 - That's Right Diana Barry- You Needed Me
 2009 - Teabagging and Other Beauty Secrets 
 2009 - The Secret Message Tapes
 2005 - Pleasure Zone
 2004 - Dad, Don’t be Mad
 2002 - Master Libation
 2001 - Watching Lesbian Porn
 2000 - The Bathroom Tapes: Track 3; Take 4 ("My Man")
 1999 - How to Fake an Orgasm (whether you need to or not)

References

External links

daynarama.com
givideo.org
vtape.org

Canadian performance artists
Women performance artists
Canadian video artists
Women video artists
Canadian women artists
Living people
Canadian LGBT artists
1972 births
21st-century Canadian LGBT people